Uwe Hohn (born 16 July 1962) is a retired German track and field athlete who competed in the javelin throw. A new javelin design was implemented in 1986 and the records had to be restarted, thus Hohn's mark became an "eternal world record". He coached Indian track and field athlete Neeraj Chopra, who won the gold in Men's javelin throw at 2020 Summer Olympics held in Tokyo.

Born in Neuruppin, Hohn excelled at the javelin throw from a young age and won the 1981 European Junior Championship with a throw of 86.56 m, a junior record. He then won gold at the 1982 European Championships with a 91.34 m throw. He did not compete at the 1983 World Championships and missed out on the 1984 Summer Olympics as East Germany had boycotted the games. He did however win gold at the Friendship Games, throwing 94.44 m (Arto Härkönen won the 1984 Olympics with a throw of 86.76 m). In 1985, Hohn won the IAAF World Cup and European Cup but his career ended in 1986 after several setbacks due to a surgery.
After his retirement from competition, Hohn became a coach and since 1999 he has worked for SC Potsdam, the successor of ASK Vorwärts Potsdam, where he started his career as a sportsman.

World record
Hohn's throw shattered the previous world record of 99.72 m set by Tom Petranoff of the United States in May 1983. Contrary to popular myth, this was not the primary reason for the change in javelin design rules that came into force starting in 1986; the relevant change of moving the javelin's centre of gravity forward by four centimetres had already been officially proposed prior to Hohn's record throw, not only to shorten distances but also to get rid of the then frequent flat or ambiguous landings, which often made it hard to assess if a throw should be declared legal. However, Hohn's record-breaking throw accelerated the process as throws of his distance were in danger of going beyond the available space in normal stadiums.

Coaching career
Hohn has been a professional coach since 1999. Among others, Hohn has coached China's national champion Zhao Qinggang. In 2017, Hohn signed the contract with the Athletics Federation of India (AFI) for coaching the Indian javelin squad including Junior world record holder Neeraj Chopra till 2020 Summer Olympics to be held in Tokyo. Neeraj Chopra won the Gold medal for India in the Men's javelin throw with a throw of 87.58 m at the  2020 Tokyo Olympics.

Personal life
Hohn has been married since 1983 and has two children.

Achievements
1976 to 1980: GDR champion for his age group 
1981: European junior champion for the GDR starting in Utrecht with 86.58 m; European junior record with 86.58 m 
1982: European Champion in Athens with 91.34 m 
1984: GDR sportsman of the year. Threw the longest men's javelin throw ever at 104.80 m.
1985: Won the javelin event at the 1985 IAAF World Cup – Canberra with 96.96 m (best performance in the world that year)
1985: Set a championship record of 92.88 m at the 1985 European Cup

References

1962 births
Living people
East German male javelin throwers
German athletics coaches
World record setters in athletics (track and field)
European Athletics Championships medalists
Friendship Games medalists in athletics
Sportspeople from Neuruppin